Swastika station is located in the community of Swastika, Ontario, Canada. It was established in 1908, along the Temiskaming and Northern Ontario Railway which is now the Ontario Northland Railway line.

It was a station stop for Northlander trains of Ontario Northland. That station is a fairly large building with former entrances on street and platform level but only a small waiting room off the platform is currently in passenger use. The indoor waiting room was once larger and featured a front desk and washrooms. Following the cancellation of the Northlander service in 2012, the station is now the bus stop location for Ontario Northland Motor Coach Services.

The train station began demolition by Ontario Northland Railway on March 10, 2021. On May 15, 2021, the train station was completely demolished. As of June 2021 there is a historic locations plaque placed by Ontario Northland to commemorate this one-of-a-kind train station that once stood on the grass hill that is now in its location.

Gallery

References

External links

ONT - Swastika Station

Ontario Northland Railway stations
Railway stations in Canada opened in 1908
Railway stations in Timiskaming District
Kirkland Lake
1908 establishments in Ontario
Disused railway stations in Canada